Heinrich is a German given name of ancient Germanic origin and cognate of Henry. Female forms are Henrike and Henriette. The most famous patron saint is Henry (died 1024), as the German Emperor Henry II.

Monarchs and royalty 
 Henry the Fowler (Heinrich I der Vogler; 876–936), first German king
 Heinrich II (972–1024), Holy Roman emperor
 Heinrich III (1017–1056), Holy Roman emperor
 Heinrich IV (1050–1106), king of Germany, Holy Roman emperor
 Heinrich V (1086–1125), king of Germany, Holy Roman emperor
 Heinrich VI (1165–1197), king of Germany, Holy Roman emperor
 Heinrich VII (1275–1313), king of Germany, Holy Roman emperor
 Heinrich I, Duke of Bavaria (919/921–955)
 Heinrich II, Duke of Bavaria (951–995)
 Heinrich III, Duke of Bavaria and Carinthia (940–989)
 Heinrich IV, Prince Reuss of Köstritz (1919–2012), head of the German Princely House of Reuss
 Heinrich, Count of Bellegarde (1756–1845), viceroy of Lombardy-Venetia, Austrian Generalfeldmarschall
 Heinrich, Duke of Saxe-Merseburg (1661–1738), member of the House of Wettin
 Heinrich, Prince of Fürstenberg (born 1950)
 Heinrich of Bavaria (1884–1916), member of the House of Wittelsbach, World War I officer
 Heinrich of Saxe-Weissenfels, Count of Barby (1657–1728), German prince of the House of Wettin
Prince Heinrich of Prussia, several Prussian princes with the same name

Archbishops 
 Heinrich I, Archbishop of Trier (d. 964)
 Heinrich I, Archbishop of Mainz (served 1142–1153)
 Heinrich I, Archbishop of Cologne (1190–1238)
 Heinrich II, Archbishop of Cologne (1244–1332)

Other people 
 Heinrich Cornelius Agrippa (1486–1535), German astrologer and alchemist
 Heinrich Andergassen (1908–1946), Austrian member of the SS and Gestapo, executed for his role in the Holocaust
 Heinrich Aviksoo (1880–1940), Estonian politician and sports figure
 Heinrich Ignaz Franz Biber (1644–1704), Bohemian-Austrian composer and violinist
 Heinrich Boere (1921-2013), German-Dutch war criminal
 Heinrich Böll (1917–1985), German writer
 Heinrich von Brühl (1700–1763), German statesman
 Heinrich Bullinger (1504–1575), Swiss Reformer
 Heinrich Danckelmann (1889–1947), German Luftwaffe general sentenced to death for war crimes
 Heinrich Danioth (1896—1953), Swiss painter and poet
 Heinrich Deubel (1890–1962), German Nazi SS concentration camp commandant
 Heinrich Dusemer (died 1353), 21st Grand Master of the Teutonic Knights
 Heinrich Wilhelm Ernst (1812–1865), Moravian-Jewish violinist and composer
 Heinrich von Gagern (1799–1880), German statesman
 Heinrich George (1893–1946), German stage and film actor
 Heinrich Grünfeld (1855–1931), Bohemian-Austrian cellist
 Heinrich von Handel-Mazzetti (1882–1940), Austrian botanist
 Heinrich Hart (1855–1906), German literary critic
 Heinrich Heine (1797–1856), German poet
 Heinrich von Herford (c. 1300–1370), Dominican friar, historian, and theologian
 Heinrich Hertz (1857–1894), German physicist
 Heinrich von Herzogenberg (1843–1900), Austrian composer and conductor
 Heinrich Himmler (1900–1945), German Nazi officer and commander of the SS (Schutzstaffel)
 Heinrich Hoffmann (author) (1809–1894), German psychiatrist
 Heinrich Hoffmann (photographer) (1885–1957), German photographer
 Heinrich Holk, Danish-German mercenary, one of the principal commanders at the Battle of Wolgast, Battle of Lützen (1632) and Siege of Stralsund (1628)
 Heinrich von Kittlitz (1799–1874), German artist, naval officer, and explorer
 Heinrich von Kleist (1777–1811), German poet, dramatist, and novelist
 Heinrich Ritter von Kogerer (1819–1899), Austrian nobleman and government official
 Heinrich Wilhelm Krausnick (1797–1882), German lawyer and Lord Mayor of Berlin
 Heinrich Krippel (1883–1945), Austrian sculptor, painter, engraver, and illustrator
 Heinrich von Lüttwitz (1896–1969), German Panzer general during World War II
 Heinrich Marx (1777-1838) Prussian lawyer and father of Karl Marx
 Heinrich von Melk (born 1163), German satirist of the 12th century
 Heinrich Müller (disambiguation), several people with the same name
 Heinrich Parler (c. 1310 – c. 1370), German architect and sculptor
 Heinrich Scheidemann (c. 1595–1663), German Renaissance-Baroque composer
 Heinrich Schliemann (1822–1890), German businessman and amateur archaeologist
 Heinrich Schönfeld (1900-1976), Austrian football player
 Heinrich Schütz (1585–1672), German Renaissance-Baroque composer
 Heinrich Schwarz (1906–1947), German SS Nazi concentration camp commandant executed for war crimes
 C. Heinrich Stratz (1858–1924), German-Russian gynecologist
 Heinrich von Sybel (1817–1895), German historian
 Heinrich Thyssen (1875–1947), German-Hungarian entrepreneur and art collector
 Heinrich von Treitschke (1834–1896), German historian and political writer
 Heinrich von Tschirschky (1858–1916), German diplomat and politician
 Heinrich Uukkivi (1912– 1943), Estonian footballer, bandy, and ice hockey player
 Heinrich von Veldeke (1140/1150 – c. 1190), Limburgish-German Medieval composer
 Heinrich von Vietinghoff (1887–1952), German colonel-general during World War II
 Heinrich Voes (died 1523), one of the first two Lutheran martyrs

Fictional characters 
 Heinrich, a character in the Conker series
 Heinrich, first name of the title character in the opera Tannhäuser
 Heinrich Zemo, a character in the Marvel Comics universe
 Heinrich, is one of the terrorists from Die Hard
 Heinrich Reichenau, a central character from Total Conquest

See also 
 Heinrich (surname)
 Heinrich (disambiguation)
 Heinrichs

Masculine given names
German masculine given names